The World Intellectual Property Organization (WIPO;  (OMPI)) is one of the 15 specialized agencies of the United Nations (UN). Pursuant to the 1967 Convention Establishing the World Intellectual Property Organization, WIPO was created to promote and protect intellectual property (IP) across the world by cooperating with countries as well as international organizations. It began operations on 26 April 1970 when the convention entered into force. The current Director General is Singaporean Daren Tang, former head of the Intellectual Property Office of Singapore, who began his term on 1 October 2020.

WIPO's activities include hosting forums to discuss and shape international IP rules and policies, providing global services that register and protect IP in different countries, resolving transboundary IP disputes, helping connect IP systems through uniform standards and infrastructure, and serving as a general reference database on all IP matters; this includes providing reports and statistics on the state of IP protection or innovation both globally and in specific countries. WIPO also works with governments, nongovernmental organizations (NGOs), and individuals to utilize IP for socioeconomic development.

WIPO administers 26 international treaties that concern a wide variety of intellectual property issues, ranging from the protection of audiovisual works to establishing international patent classification. It is governed by the General Assembly and the Coordination Committee, which together set policy and serve as the main decision making bodies. The General Assembly also elects WIPO's chief administrator, the Director General, currently Daren Tang of Singapore, who took office on 1 October 2020. WIPO is administered by a Secretariat that helps carry out its day-to-day activities.

Headquartered in Geneva, Switzerland, WIPO has "external offices" around the world, including in Algiers (Algeria); Rio de Janeiro (Brazil); Beijing (China), Tokyo (Japan); Abuja (Nigeria); Moscow (Russia); and Singapore (Singapore). Unlike most UN organizations, WIPO does not rely heavily on assessed or voluntary contributions from member states; 95 percent of its budget comes from fees related to its global services.

WIPO currently has 193 member states, including 190 UN member states and the Cook Islands, Holy See and Niue; Palestine has permanent observer status. The only non-members, among the countries recognised by the UN are the Federated States of Micronesia, Palau and South Sudan.

History

Pre BIRPI

1883 – Paris Convention for the Protection of Industrial Property 

The Paris Convention for the Protection of Industrial Property was adopted in 1883 and was one of the first intellectual property treaties. It established a Union for the protection of industrial property. It applies to a wide range of industrial property including patents, trademarks, utility models, industrial designs, trade names, service marks, geographical indications as well as the "repression of unfair competition". The Paris Convention was the first international agreement to protect the works of creators in other countries.

The Convention was adopted in diplomatic conferences held in Paris in 1880 and 1883, it was then signed on 20 March 1883, on behalf of Brazil, France, Guatemala, Netherlands, Portugal, Serbia, Spain and Switzerland, Belgium, Italy and El Salvador. It consisted of the Convention proper, which contains 19 articles, and the Protocole de clôture (Final Protocol), which is almost the same length as the Convention proper.

The "International Bureau" established by the Paris Convention for the Protection of Industrial Property later became part of BIRPI and later WIPO.

1886 – Berne Convention for the Protection of Literary and Artistic Works 

The Berne Convention was adopted in 1886, it deals with copyright, the protection of works and rights of authors and rights holders. It provides creators including writers, poets, painters, musicians with ways to control how and by who their works are used and the terms of use. It also contains provisions on minimum protections and special provisions for developing countries. The Convention follows three basic principles; that works originating in one of the Contracting States must be given the same protection in each of the other Contracting States (principle of "national treatment"), that there is automatic protection and no formal process is required and that protection under the convention is independent of protection in the country of origin of the work (principle of "independence" of protection). The "International Bureau" was created to oversee the Berne Convention and later became part of BIRPI and later WIPO.

1891 – Madrid Agreement Concerning the International Registration of Marks 

In 1891 nine of the 14 States to the Paris Convention for the Protection of Industrial Property created the first "special arrangements for the protection of industrial property". Along with the Protocol Relating to the Madrid Agreement (1989) it created the Madrid System, the primary international system for facilitating the registration of trademarks in multiple jurisdictions around the world.

BIRPI 

The Bureaus created to administer the Berne Convention for the Protection of Literary and Artistic Works and the Paris Convention for the Protection of Industrial Property were under "the high supervision" (haute surveillance) of the Government of the Swiss Confederation. In 1893 the Swiss government combined them with the same director and same staff as United International Bureaux for the Protection of Intellectual Property, Bureaux internationaux réunis pour la protection de la propriété intellectuelle (BIRPI). BIRPI was the predecessor of the World Intellectual Property Organization (WIPO) which superseded it 87 years later, in 1970.

Formation of WIPO 
WIPO was formally created by the Convention Establishing the World Intellectual Property Organization, which entered into force on 26 April 1970. WIPO allowed members who were part of the Berne Convention, Paris Convention or a member of the United Nations system including the United Nations, any of its specialized agencies, the International Atomic Energy Agency or the International Court of Justice.

That date is commemorated annually as World Intellectual Property Day, which raises awareness of the importance of IP. Under Article 3 of this convention, WIPO seeks to "promote the protection of intellectual property throughout the world". WIPO became a specialized agency of the UN in 1974. The Agreement between the United Nations and the World Intellectual Property Organization notes in Article 1 that WIPO is responsible:

The Agreement marked a transition for WIPO from the mandate it inherited in 1967 from BIRPI, to promote the protection of intellectual property, to one that involved the more complex task of promoting technology transfer and economic development.

WIPO joining the United Nations 

In 1974 WIPO became a specialized agency of the United Nations through a bilateral agreement between WIPO and the United Nations.This was approved by the General Assembly of WIPO on 27 September 1974, and by the General Assembly of the United Nations on 17 December 1974. A protocol was signed by Secretary-General of the United Nations, Kurt Waldheim and Director General of WIPO Árpád Bogsch, on 21 January 1975, with the Agreement starting on 17 December 1974.

WIPO Development agenda 
In October 2004, WIPO agreed to adopt a proposal offered by Argentina and Brazil, the "Proposal for the Establishment of a Development Agenda for WIPO"—from the Geneva Declaration on the Future of the World Intellectual Property Organization. This proposal was well supported by developing countries. The agreed "WIPO Development Agenda" (composed of over 45 recommendations) was the culmination of a long process of transformation for the organization from one that had historically been primarily aimed at protecting the interests of rightholders, to one that has increasingly incorporated the interests of other stakeholders in the international intellectual property system as well as integrating into the broader corpus of international law on human rights, environment and economic cooperation.

A number of civil society bodies have been working on a draft Access to Knowledge (A2K) treaty which they would like to see introduced.

In 2009, WIPO started drafting future treaties on intellectual property and genetic resources, traditional knowledge and folklore in relation with indigenous peoples and local communities.

In December 2011, WIPO published its first World Intellectual Property Report on the Changing Face of Innovation, the first such report of the new Office of the Chief Economist. WIPO is also a co-publisher of the Global Innovation Index.

Recent events 

In September 2020 China blocked the Wikimedia Foundation from observer status at WIPO citing the existence of a Wikimedia affiliate in Taiwan. According to the Chinese statement "there is reason to believe that this foundation has been carrying out political activities through its member organizations which could undermine the state's sovereignty and territorial integrity." China again rejected Wikimedia's bid, for the same reason, in October 2021.

WIPO, the World Health Organization (WHO) and the WTO launched on 11 April 2022 their new Trilateral COVID-19 Technical Assistance Platform. This new tool aims to help members and WTO accession candidates address their capacity building needs to respond to the COVID-19 pandemic. The Platform provides members and accession candidates with a single contact form which they can use to reach out to the trilateral organizations.

Global services

Patent Cooperation Treaty 

The Patent Cooperation Treaty (PCT) (1970) established a service which assists individuals, companies, and institutions in seeking patent protection internationally for their inventions. It also helps patent offices with their patent granting decisions and facilitates public access to technical information relating to those inventions. 153 countries are currently party to the PCT.

Under the PCT, an applicant can file one PCT application in one language, at one patent office, within 12 months from the date of the earliest patent application which has been filed for the same invention (the "priority date"). This one PCT application has the same legal effect as filing separate regional or national patent applications in all PCT member countries.

PCT applications are processed in a standardized manner as provided in the Treaty and Regulations, including an international search for documents relevant to the potential patentability of the invention and international publication. Granting patents remains under the control of the regional or national patent Offices in the "national phase".

Using the PCT, patent applicants can postpone paying national and regional patent-related fees while they learn about the likelihood of obtaining a patent, benefitting from the additional time and information to help them decide whether, and in which countries, to pursue patents.

Madrid System 

The Madrid System for the International Registration of Marks serves as a means to seek protection for trademarks worldwide, in over 120 countries. Created in 1891, the Madrid System is now governed by the Madrid Protocol Relating to the Madrid Agreement Concerning the International Registration of Marks (1989). In order to become a member of the Madrid System, a state or intergovernmental organization must already be a party to the Paris Convention for the Protection of Industrial Property (1883).

The Madrid System is a centralized trademark registration system: through a single application, in one language and with one set of fees (in one currency, the Swiss franc), protection can be obtained in member states and intergovernmental organizations. International registrations can then be modified, renewed or expanded, centrally through WIPO (rather than through each separate IP Office).

The Madrid System can only be used by a natural person or a legal entity, which is a national, is domiciled or has a company in the territory of a member of the Madrid System.

Lisbon System 
The Lisbon System for the International Registration of Appellations of Origin and Geographical indications provides a means of obtaining international protection for a geographical indication or an appellation of origin. Geographical indications and appellations of origin are intellectual property rights which identify a product that originates from a specific geographical area and that has characteristics that are attributable to its geographical origin. Comté cheese (France), Chulucanas pottery (Peru), Tequila (Mexico), Porto (Portugal), Herend porcelain (Hungary), and Kampot pepper (Cambodia) are examples of appellations of origin and geographical indications registered under the Lisbon System. Through a single registration and one set of fees, protection can be obtained in the other countries (and intergovernmental organizations, such as the European Union) covered by the Lisbon System.

The Lisbon System includes the Lisbon Agreement for the Protection of Appellations of Origin and their International Registration of 1958 ('the Lisbon Agreement') and, its latest revision, the Geneva Act of the Lisbon Agreement on Appellations of Origin and Geographical Indications of 2015 ('the Geneva Act') form the Lisbon System. Registrations under the Lisbon System are published in the official bulletin and can be searched through the Lisbon Express Database.

WIPO Arbitration and Mediation Center 
The WIPO Arbitration and Mediation Center was established in 1994 as an international resource for alternatives to court litigation of intellectual property and technology disputes. It offers alternative dispute resolution (ADR) options including mediation, arbitration, and expert determination to resolve international commercial disputes between private parties. It is an administrator of cases and a provider of legal and policy expertise. The Center also provides domain name dispute resolution services under the WIPO-designed UDRP. It is based in Geneva, Switzerland and since 2010 the Center has had an office at Maxwell Chambers in Singapore.

Hague System 

The WIPO Hague System for the International Registration of Industrial Designs provides an international mechanism for securing protection of up to 100 designs in multiple countries or regions, through a single international application, filed in one language and using one currency (Swiss francs).

International design applications are filed directly through WIPO, according to the requirements and procedures established by the Hague Agreement. The domestic legal framework of each designated contracting party governs the design protection provided by the resulting international registrations.

According to the rules laid out by the Hague Agreement, anyone who is a national of, or who has a domicile, habitual residence or real and effective industrial or commercial establishment in any Hague System contracting party – including any country of the European Union or the African Intellectual Property Organization – can use the Hague System. The Hague System does not require the applicant to file a national or regional design application.

On February 5, 2020, China officially deposited its accession documents for entering the Hague System for the International Registration of Industrial Designs and the Marrakesh Treaty (which increases the accessibility of publications to people with visual impairment), before the commencement of the Beijing Olympic Winter Games. The accession will take effect on May 5, 2022.

China became the 68th contracting party to the Geneva Act (1999) of the Hague Agreement and, therefore, the 77th member of the Hague System.

Funding 
WIPO, unlike other UN agencies, derives most of its income from fees for the Global IP services it provides as opposed to Member States contributions. In 2020, WIPO's revenue amounted to CHF 468.3 million. In 2020 WIPO generated over 94.3% of its revenue from fees that are paid by users of its intellectual property services for patents, trademarks and industrial designs due to international demand for intellectual property titles. These services are provided through the Patent Cooperation Treaty (PCT) (providing 76.6% of revenue), Madrid System (providing 16.3% of revenue) and Hague System (providing 1.4% of revenue).

Governance and normative work

WIPO Assemblies 
WIPO Assemblies develop global intellectual property agreements through bringing stakeholders together. The main policy and decision making bodies of WIPO are the Coordination Committee and the General Assembly. Twenty-two Assemblies, the Unions administered by WIPO, and other bodies of the Member States of WIPO meet in ordinary or extraordinary sessions in autumn. The General Assembly appoints the Director General through nomination by the Coordination Committee. Any of the policy and decision making bodies can constitute Permanent Committees or Standing Committees.

Standing Committees 
Standing committees are ad hoc groups of experts established for a given purpose and acting as a place for policy discussions and negotiations on the future development of intellectual property. Any WIPO Standing Committee or other bodies also decide to establish a working group to examine a question in more detail, make suggestions or give advice on any subject within the competence of the Organization.

WIPO administered treaties 
WIPO administers 26 treaties, including the WIPO Convention.

Intellectual property protection treaties 
Intellectual property protection treaties define internationally agreed basic standards of intellectual property (IP) protection in each country.

Global protection system treaties 

Global protection system treaties govern WIPO's services, ensuring that one international registration or filing will have effect in any of the relevant signatory States.

Classification treaties 
Classification treaties that create classification systems that organize information concerning inventions, trademarks and industrial designs.

Policy work

Genetic resources, traditional knowledge and traditional cultural expressions 
For years, many local communities, Indigenous peoples and governments have sought effective intellectual property (IP) protection for traditional cultural expressions (folklore) and traditional knowledge as tradition-based forms of ingenuity and creativity. As a living body of knowledge developed, sustained and passed on from generation to generation within a community, it is not easily protected under the current IP system, which typically grants protection for a limited period to new inventions and original works as private rights. Some genetic resources, too, are linked to traditional knowledge and related practices through their use and conservation by Indigenous peoples and local communities. Although genetic resources, as encountered in nature, are not eligible for IP protection, inventions based on or developed with the use of genetic resources may be patentable. Since 2010, the Intergovernmental Committee on Intellectual Property and Genetic Resources, Traditional Knowledge and Folklore (IGC) has been negotiating the text of one or several legal instruments on the matter.

Global health 
WIPO Re:Search is a public-private partnership between WIPO and the non-profit BIO Ventures for Global Health focused on early-stage medical research and development against neglected tropical diseases (NTDs), malaria and tuberculosis. It has 150 members, including eight of the world's largest pharmaceutical companies. WIPO Re:Search supports collaborations between scientific institutions and pharmaceutical companies all over the world with the goal to advance research for medicines, treatment methods and diagnostic techniques against the neglected tropical diseases that affect over 1 billion people worldwide. Through these collaborations as well as its fellowship program, WIPO Re:Search provides shared compound libraries, repurposing methods, capacity building and works on the growth of international scientific networks.

Green technologies 

WIPO GREEN is a free to access online marketplace for sustainable technology. It consists of three main elements: WIPO GREEN online database of green technologies and needs, WIPO GREEN Acceleration Projects, and WIPO GREEN partners network. It has a network of 146 partners and aims to bring together organizations in green technology help the implementation and diffusion of green technologies around the world. The WIPO GREEN database is an online platform where green technology inventors can promote their products and businesses, organizations, governments who are looking for green technologies can explain their needs and seek collaboration with providers. WIPO GREEN 'acceleration projects' are organized annually in different countries or regions of the world, in collaboration with local organizations. These projects usually address a particular field and connect providers and seekers of green technologies.

WIPO Judicial Institute 

The WIPO Judicial Institute was established in 2019 to coordinate and lead WIPO's work with national and regional judiciaries. This work includes convening international meetings between judges, implementing judicial capacity building activities, producing resources and publications for use by judges, and administering the WIPO Lex database that provides free public access to intellectual property (IP) laws, treaties and judicial decisions from around the world. WIPO has also established an advisory board of Judges, currently comprising 12 members who serve in their personal capacity.

WIPO Academy 

The WIPO Academy is the training arm of the World Intellectual Property Organization (WIPO), it was established in 1998. It offers intellectual property (IP) education, training and IP skills-building to government officials, inventors, creators, business professionals, small and medium enterprises (SMEs), academics, students and individuals interested in IP. The Academy hosts IP courses through its four programs: the Professional Development Program, University Partnerships, Distance Learning and WIPO Summer Schools.

The Standing Committee on Copyright and Related Rights 
The Standing Committee on Copyright and Related Rights (SCCR) was created in the 1998 to examine issues in the field of copyright and related rights on substantive law and harmonization. The Committee includes all member states of WIPO, some member states of the United Nations who are not members of WIPO, and a number of non-governmental and intergovernmental observers. The Committee meets twice per year and formulates recommendations for consideration by the WIPO General Assembly. The main topics currently under discussion are the protection of broadcasting organizations and limitations and exceptions. Copyright in the digital environment, the resale royalty right and the rights of theater directors are also being discussed within the Committee.

World Intellectual Property Day 

World Intellectual Property Day is an annual global public awareness campaign to "highlight the role and contribution of intellectual property in the economic, cultural and social development of all countries as well as to raise public awareness and understanding in this field of human endeavor." In 2000, WIPO's Member States formally designated 26 April – the day on which the WIPO Convention came into force in 1970 – as World Intellectual Property Day. The first World Intellectual Property Day was held in 2001.

Sectors and divisions

Economics and Statistics Division
WIPO's Economics and Statistics Division gathers data on intellectual property activity worldwide and publishes statistics to the public. The Division also conducts economic analysis on how government IP and innovation policies affect economic performance.

Infrastructure and Platforms Sector
The Infrastructure and Platforms sector develops, implements and maintains the various databases, tools and platforms of the Organization that are targeted at and used by intellectual property offices, legal professionals, researchers, and other specialized users. The sector also covers the use of 'frontier technologies' such as artificial intelligence and coordinates WIPO's overall customer goals, strategies and tools.

Diplomatic Engagement and Assemblies Affairs Division 
The Diplomatic Engagement and Assemblies Affairs Division is directly under the supervision of the Director General, it focuses on engagement with the diplomatic community in Geneva through events, meetings and overseeing the administrative, logistical and other aspects of key meetings including the Assemblies of WIPO. The Division is also responsible for supervising the full range of protocol services across the Organization. Specifically, the Division is responsible for meeting all the Director General's representation and hospitality protocol-related needs and protocol-related needs for meetings and events.

Traditional Knowledge Division 
The Traditional Knowledge Division carries out WIPO’s work on genetic resources, traditional cultural expressions and traditional knowledge through its seven service areas. These include supporting indigenous and local community entrepreneurship in making strategic and effective use of intellectual property tools in their businesses; providing intellectual property advice on the documentation of traditional knowledge and traditional cultural expressions; organizing hands-on training, mentoring and distance learning programs; and acting as a global reference of information resources on the intersection of IP and genetic resources, traditional knowledge and traditional cultural expressions, as well as maintaining a repository of regional, national and community experiences. The Traditional Knowledge Division is also responsible for facilitating multilateral negotiations in the WIPO Intergovernmental Committee on Intellectual Property and Genetic Resources, Traditional Knowledge and Folklore.

Publications and databases 
WIPO publishes around 40 new titles a year, which are translated and published in the official languages of the United Nations: Arabic, Chinese, English, French, Russian and Spanish. The WIPO Knowledge Repository holds the archive of WIPO publications and documentations since 1885, as well as a library of academic research literature on intellectual property. WIPO adopted an Open Access Policy in 2016. Its publications are free to reuse and modify, under the terms of the Creative Commons Attribution 4.0 license.

World Intellectual Property Indicators

Since 2009, WIPO has published the annual World Intellectual Property Indicators, providing a wide range of indicators covering the areas of intellectual property. It draws on data from national and regional IP offices, the WIPO, the World Bank, and UNESCO.

Global Innovation Index

The Global Innovation Index is an annual ranking of countries by their capacity for, and success in, innovation, published by the World Intellectual Property Organization. It was started in 2007 by INSEAD and World Business, a British magazine. Until 2021 it was published by WIPO, in partnership with Cornell University, INSEAD, and other organisations and institutions,. It is based on both subjective and objective data derived from several sources, including the International Telecommunication Union, the World Bank and the World Economic Forum.

WIPO Lex

WIPO Lex is an online global database launched in 2010, which provides free public access to intellectual property laws, treaties and judicial decisions from around the world. In 2022, the WIPO Lex database contained 48,000 national, regional and international legal documents relating to intellectual property, with access in the six UN languages.

WIPO Magazine 
WIPO Magazine, the organization's flagship outreach publication, is available in eight languages (Arabic, Chinese, English, French, Japanese, Portuguese, Russian and Spanish). Established in 1999, and online since 2005, WIPO Magazine explores the worlds of innovation and creativity, and the role of IP in advancing human progress. The WIPO Magazine features a range of articles on how people around the world are using IP rights to advance their goals and support national economic development. It also includes expert commentary on the latest “hot topics” relating to IP policy and practice. The WIPO Magazine is free of charge. In January 2023, it moved to a digital-only format.

PATENTSCOPE

PATENTSCOPE is a public patent database provided by WIPO that serves as an official publication source for patent applications filed under the Patent Cooperation Treaty and covers numerous national and regional patent collections. In 2021 it held over 100 million patent documents including 4.2 million published international patent applications.

Directors General 

On 1 October 2020, Daren Tang of Singapore succeeded Gurry as Director General. His candidacy was backed by the United States and 54 other countries over China's preferred candidate, Wang Binying, who received 28 votes out of the 83 voting members.

See also 
 Anti-Counterfeiting Trade Agreement
 Intellectual property organization
 List of parties to international copyright agreements
 Uniform Domain-Name Dispute-Resolution Policy
 World Intellectual Property Organization treaties

Notes

References

Further reading 
 Research Handbook on the World Intellectual Property Organization: The First 50 Years and Beyond

External links 

 
 List of member states

 
International trade organizations
Patent law organizations
Patent offices
United Nations specialized agencies
Organizations established in 1967
United Nations organizations based in Geneva